The Fly is a 25ft high  sport route or  boulder located in the Rumney Rocks climbing area (commonly known by climbers as "Rumney") Rumney, New Hampshire, USA. It is located at the Waimea Cliff.

The Fly was first envisioned and bolted by Mark Sprague in 1995 as an open project for all to try but did not see a free ascent until David Graham, an 18-year-old American climber from Maine, climbed it in April 2000. It was quickly repeated by his climbing partner, Luke Parady. These ascents were milestones for the young up and coming climbers and the Rumney area, as (at the time) they were at the cutting edge grade of physical difficulty in North America.

Route Description
The Fly ascends a short, steep, lower portion of the Waimea wall, gaining a large ledge (the E-Ticket Ledge) and a bolted anchor about 25 feet up. The climb is very fingery and powerful.

The route is quite short by sport climbing standards, essentially a rope protected boulder problem, with its two protection bolts being placed before the now common use of many stacked 'crash pads' to protect the dangerous landing. Most ascents make use of the protection offered by the bolts, usually preclipping the rope to them both, though after practicing the moves on a rope, the climb has been 'bouldered' (sans rope), first by Jason Kehl, on November 7, 2003.

First Ascent
David Graham made the first ascent (FA) on April 7, 2000. After further ascents and fine tuning of the beta (choreography) needed to climb it, the consensus has settled to approximately  using the Yosemite decimal system or 8B/+ in the Font bouldering grade.

Repetitions
Luke Parady (on April 27, 2001)
Tony Lamiche (on October 10, 2003)
Chris Sharma (on October 30, 2003) - almost a flash, he fell on the last move.
Jason Kehl (on November 7, 2003)
Kevin Jorgeson (in April 2008)
Paul Robinson (in April 2008) 
Daniel Woods (in October 2008)
Alexander Megos (in October 2012)
Mike Foley (on November 13, 2015)
Andrew Palmer (on April 5, 2018)
Alex Waterhouse (in Spring 2019)
Both Lamiche and Sharma pre-clipped the second bolt on their redpoints.

Kehl and Jorgeson, both known for highball bouldering, bouldered the route after practicing the moves on a rope. Although the route is not particularly high, the landing is dangerous with an uneven surface and the potential to fall off a larger ledge.

References

Climbing routes
Grafton County, New Hampshire